Iga Świątek was the defending champion, but chose not to participate.

Olga Danilović won the title, defeating Julia Grabher in the final, 6–2, 6–3.

Seeds

Draw

Finals

Top half

Bottom half

References

Main Draw

Montreux Ladies Open - Singles
Montreux Ladies Open